Ab Chendaran-e Olya Gelal (also Romanized as Āb Chendārān-e ‘Olyā Gelāl; also known as Āb Chendār) is a village in Chin Rural District, Ludab District, Boyer-Ahmad County, Kohgiluyeh and Boyer-Ahmad Province, Iran. At the 2006 census, its population was 101, in 19 families.

References 

Populated places in Boyer-Ahmad County